Unakkaga Oru Kavithai is a 2010 Indian Tamil language romantic drama film directed by Karthick Kumar. The film stars Vinoth Kumaran and Risha, with Srinivasan, Balaji, K. N. Ramesh, Balu Anand, Pandu, Anu Mohan and Kadhal Sukumar playing supporting roles. The film had musical score by Julie Bruce and was released on 25 June 2010.

Plot

In Pollachi, Vinoth is a good-for-nothing youngster who often gets into trouble, and his parents hate him for being irresponsible. For his studies, Vinoth joins a college in Chennai. He slowly becomes a hard-working student, and he even donates one of his kidneys to an ill girl. His college mate Nandhini falls in love with him but her father Jairam, who is greedy, wants her to marry her wicked relative Sunil. In the meantime, the lecherous college student Rocky falls under the spell of Nandhini and wants to marry her.

Nandhini finally declares her love to Vinoth, and he accepts. Meanwhile, Jairam kicks Sunil out his house. He then makes a deal with Rocky and promises him to give his daughter in exchange for money. When Jairam discovers her love affair, he does not allow his daughter Nandhini to go to college and locks her in a room. Vinoth enters her house to save her, and during the fight, he is stabbed by Rocky. At the hospital, the doctor announces that Vinoth's remaining kidney is heavily damaged. The film ends with Vinoth dying in the hospital bed and Nandhini, his parents and his friends mourning his death.

Cast

Vinoth Kumaran (T. Saby Thomas) as Vinoth
Risha as Nandhini
Srinivasan as Jairam, Nandhini's father
Balaji as Rocky
K. N. Ramesh as Sunil
Balu Anand as Vinoth's father
Pandu as Kannayiram
Anu Mohan as Canteen Manager
Kadhal Sukumar as Sukumar, Vinoth's friend
Soori as Vinoth's friend
Mano as Vinoth's friend
Kottachi as Kottachi
Sharmili as Alangaram
Baby Parveen
Gym Murugesan
Kandaraj
Robert
Veerasamy
Pandi Mansoor
Jennifer in a special appearance

Production
Karthick Kumar made his directorial debut with Neethana Avan under the banner of Thomas Cine Creations. The film producer T. Saby Thomas himself played the lead role and was christened as Vinoth Kumaran while Risha signed to play the heroine. Srinivasan, a medical practitioner, was cast to play the villain role.

Soundtrack

The film score and the soundtrack were composed by Julie Bruce. The soundtrack, released in 2010, features 5 tracks with lyrics written by Vinoth Kumaran, Jeba, Devadeva, Martin and Srinivasan.

References

2010 films
2010s Tamil-language films
Indian romantic drama films
2010 romantic drama films